Nigerian prince may refer to:

 Nigerian traditional rulers or, specifically, the junior dynasts of their royal houses in the wider Nigerian chieftaincy system
 a stereotypical part of an advance-fee scam
 Nigerian Prince (film), a 2018 Nigerian-American film